The Kaingang language (also spelled Kaingáng) is a Southern Jê language (Jê, Macro-Jê) spoken by the Kaingang people of southern Brazil. The Kaingang nation has about 30,000 people, and about from 60% to 65% speak the language. Most also speak Portuguese.

Overview
The Kaingang language is a member of the Jê family, the largest language family in the Macro-Jê stock. The Kaingang territory occupies the modern states of São Paulo, Paraná, Santa Catarina and Rio Grande do Sul (and, until the beginning of the 20th century, Misiones, Argentina). Today they live in around 30 indigenous lands (similar to Native American reservations), especially at Rio Grande do Sul and Paraná.

In the 1960s, because of a missionary interest (conducted by the Summer Institute of Linguistics (SIL)), the language was studied by Ursula Wiesemann.

Names
The Kaingang and Xokleng were previously considered a single ethnicity, which went by a number of names, including Amhó, Dorin, Gualachi, Chiqui, Ingain, Botocudo, Ivitorocái (= Amho), Kamé, Kayurukré, Tain (= Ingain), Taven. Some of these may have been tribal names; others were exonyms. Those living along the coast at the time of the Conquest were called Guayaná, and are considered to be the ancestors of the Kaingang.  It is unknown to what extent the names might have corresponded to dialectal differences.

Dialects

Loukotka (1968)
Loukotka (1968) lists the following dialects of Kaingán and related language varieties.

Kaingán / Caingang / Camé / Taven / Kaingygn / Coroado / Kadyrukré
Central - spoken between the Ivaí River and Tiquié River, Paraná State
Southern or Iñacoré - spoken in the state of Rio Grande do Sul, now in the villages surrounding the cities of Nonohag and Cáceres.
Northern - once spoken on the Tiete River
Eastern / Nhakfáteitei / Yakwändatéye / Guayana de Paranapamena - formerly spoken in the state of São Paulo on the Paranapanema River
Binaré - once spoken on the left shore of the Uruguay River in the state of Rio Grande do Sul
Xiqui - extinct language from Mato Grosso State, once spoken on the São Francisco River and Piquirí River
Aweicoma / Bugres / Owaikománg / Xocren - spoken in Santa Catarina State in the hinterland of the cities of Itajaí, Palmas, and Blumenau

Mason (1950)
Mason (1950) lists the following classification for the Caingang group of languages:

Caingang
São Paulo (Coroado); Nyacfateitei
Paraná
Rio Grande do Sul
Shocleng
Taven
Tain
Ingain (Wayana, Guayaná)
Patte (Basa)
Chowa
Chowaca
Ivitorocai
Gualacho (Coronado)
Gualachí
Chiki
Cabelludo
Dorin
(bands: Jahuateie, Venharo)
(moieties: Cayurucré, Votoro, Camó)

Mason (1950) also lists the Yabutian languages Aricapú and Yabuti as "possibly Caingang."

Phonology

Consonants
A large number of allophones map to a set of 14 phonemes:

All consonants have varying allophones depending on their position in the word and on the adjacency of nasal vowels:
 The oral stops have prenasalized allophones  when following a nasal vowel. In unstressed syllables,  is furthermore voiced to become .
 The glottal stop  and the non-stop consonants are realized as nasalized  preceding nasal vowels.
 The phonemes  are only realized as voiced oral stops between two oral vowels. They are realized as voiced prenasalized stops  when between a nasal and an oral vowel, as well as word-initially before oral vowels. Between an oral and a nasal vowel they are conversely realized as prestopped . Between two nasal vowels, or word-initially before nasal vowels, they are realized as full nasal stops: . The first two types of realization also apply when occurring in the syllable coda and followed by a non-nasal segment; these voiced/prenasalized will however be additionally unreleased: .
 When preceded by an oral vowel, the sequences  can be realized as geminate stops: .
  is optionally labialized:  , etc.
 The non-glottal fricatives can word-initially be optionally realized as affricates  (including their nasal allophones: .)
As a syllable coda it is a flap when oral and approximant when nasal, and may optionally be palatalized: . 
 Word-initially in a stressed syllable,  may vary in realization between dental  and alveolar . Following palatal consonants or preceding a close vowel, it can also realized as a palatal stop, .

Vowels

 The backness of the unrounded back vowels  varies between back  and central .
 All of the oral vowels  can be realized as voiceless .
 Nasal vowels have the same quality as oral vowels.

Orthography 

Wiesemann proposed an alphabet for the language, which is still in use despite some problems. It is based on the Latin script, and consists of fourteen consonants and fourteen vowels, matching the fourteen consonants and fourteen vowels of the Kaingang language.

There are dictionaries and grammars available for Kaingang. A school was set up in 1969 to teach the Kaingang people to read and write their language. However, the school produced many Kaingang speakers who went back to their reservations to teach others and spread the writing innovations they learned. Only one of the dialects is used as the standard written form, though having the writing system provided a source of pride in the language for the Kaingang people. A Kaingang bible has been published, as well as a dictionary and other publications.

Examples of Kaingang writing can be found on Omniglot.

Grammar

Postpositions

Kaingang makes use of postpositions.

 goj: water
 goj ki: in the water

Postpositions are also used to mark subject.

 Mĩg vỹ venhvó tĩ. The jaguar runs. 
 Kofá tóg pỹn tãnh. The old man killed the snake.

Verbs

Kaingang verbs do not inflect.

 rãgró: to plant
 Ti tóg rãgró krãn huri. He planted beans.
 Ẽg tóg rãgró krãn huri. We planted beans.

Vocabulary
Loukotka (1968) lists the following basic vocabulary items for Kaingán language varieties.

References

Bibliography

External links 

 Catálogo de Línguas Sul-Americanas: Kaingáng
 Portal Kaingang
 Kaingang phonology and Macro-Ge languages
 Comparison of English and Kaingang phrases
 Jolkesky, M. P. V. (2006a). Língua, lexicografia e os SILogismos em Kaingang - Português Dicionário Bilingüe.  (manuscrito)
 Jolkesky, M. P. V. (2006b). Análise semiótica de um texto Kaingáng.  (manuscrito)
 Jolkesky, M. P. V.; Santos, L. C. (2008). Construções relativas restritivas em Kaingáng.  Em: S. Telles & A. S. de Paula  (orgs.) Topicalizando Macro-Jê, 247-260. Recife: NECTAR.
 Kaingáng (Intercontinental Dictionary Series)

Analytic languages
Indigenous languages of the Americas
Isolating languages
Jê languages
Languages of Brazil